Elections were held for the City of Greater Geelong council in Australia on 27 October 2012. In addition to electing a new 12 member council, Geelong also directly elected its first Mayor. Independent candidate Keith Fagg won the election convincingly, winning 43.28% of the primary vote. Then-mayor Labor aligned John Mitchell won 13.88% of the vote.

Background 
As part of an election pledge, the Victorian state government made good on their promise to give Geelong residents the ability to directly elect their next mayor, with the bill passing through the Victorian upper-house on 9 February 2012.

John Mitchell was Geelong's Mayor for the last four years prior to this election. He unsuccessfully ran for re-election.

Mayoral candidates
Nine candidates ran in this election.

References 

Elections in Victoria (Australia)
2012 elections in Australia
Mayoral elections in Australia
2010s in Victoria (Australia)
City of Greater Geelong
October 2012 events in Australia